Mateusz Włodzimierz Mika (born 21 January 1991) is a Polish professional volleyball player, a former member of the Poland national team. A participant in the Olympic Games Rio 2016, 2014 World Champion, and the 2012 Polish Champion with Asseco Resovia. At the professional club level, he plays for the Turkish team, Türşad.

Career

Clubs
In 2012 Mika joined LOTOS Trefl Gdańsk. In the season 2013/2014 he was playing for the French club – Montpellier UC. On 12 June 2014 he came back to Gdańsk and signed a contract with LOTOS Trefl Gdańsk. On 19 April 2015 LOTOS Trefl Gdańsk, including Mika, won the Polish Cup. He was named the Most Valuable Player of the tournament. During the same season he won a silver medal of the Polish Championship. In April 2015 he signed a new two–year contract with the club.

National team
He debuted in the Poland men's national volleyball team on 29 May 2010 in a friendly match with France. In 2011 he was a member of the Polish team coached by Andrea Anastasi at the 2011 CEV European Championship, where Poland managed to win a bronze medal. In 2014 he was appointed to the Polish team by a head coach of that time – Stéphane Antiga at the 2014 FIVB World League. Initially, he was supposed to be a reserve player during the matches in Brazil, but after a few victories (among others, the won match against Brazil on 30 May 2014) he has become a main favorite to play at the 2014 FIVB World Championship. On 16 August 2014 he was appointed to the squad at the 2014 FIVB World Championship held in Poland. On 21 September 2014 the Polish team won the title of World Champion 2014. On 27 October 2014 he received a state award granted by the Polish President, Bronisław Komorowski – Gold Cross of Merit for outstanding sports achievements and worldwide promotion of Poland.

Honours

Clubs
 CEV Cup
  2011/2012 – with Asseco Resovia

 National championships
 2011/2012  Polish Championship, with Asseco Resovia
 2014/2015  Polish Cup, with Trefl Gdańsk
 2015/2016  Polish SuperCup, with Trefl Gdańsk
 2017/2018  Polish Cup, with Trefl Gdańsk

Youth national team
 2007  CEV U19 European Championship

Individual awards
 2015: Polish Cup – Most Valuable Player
 2015: Polish SuperCup – Most Valuable Player
 2018: Polish Cup – Best Receiver

State awards
 2014:  Gold Cross of Merit

References

External links

 
 Player profile at PlusLiga.pl 
 Player profile at Volleybox.net
 
 

1991 births
Living people
People from Bielsko County
Sportspeople from Silesian Voivodeship
Polish men's volleyball players
Polish Champions of men's volleyball
Olympic volleyball players of Poland
Volleyball players at the 2016 Summer Olympics
Recipients of the Gold Cross of Merit (Poland)
Polish expatriate sportspeople in France
Expatriate volleyball players in France
Polish expatriate sportspeople in Turkey
Expatriate volleyball players in Turkey
Resovia (volleyball) players
Trefl Gdańsk players
AZS Olsztyn players
Outside hitters